Knightsbridge Schools International Montenegro, also known as KSI Montenegro, is a co-educational, private international day school and boarding school for students aged 3–18.  The school is located in Tivat, Montenegro.

The school is part of Knightsbridge Schools International (KSI), a pair of international schools based in Colombia and Montenegro and is affiliated with Knightsbridge School in London.

Curriculum 
KSI Montenegro is accredited to teach the International Baccalaureate programme and is an IB World School. The school offers the IB Primary Years Programme, IB Middle Years Programme and IB Diploma Programme.

KSI Montenegro is an IB world school offering the International Baccalaureate curriculum for children aged 3–18.

 Primary Years Programme (IB PYP)
 Middle Years Programme (IB MYP)
 Diploma Years Programme (IB DP)

The International Baccalaureate is highly regarded in the international community and respected by leading universities. The IB:

 encourages students of all ages to think critically and challenge assumptions
 encourages students of all ages to consider both local and global contexts
 develops multilingual students

The programme encourages both personal and academic achievement, challenging students to excel in their studies and take their learning beyond academic studies, being active in their communities.

Language programmes 
English is the primary language of instruction whilst providing lessons to support the learning of Montenegrin, the host country language, enables our learners to develop better cultural understanding and integrate into the Montenegrin community.

A third language and/or mother tongue language support is also offered to support our school’s mission of enabling learners to engage productively and creatively in a global environment. French and German are also offered as part of the curriculum.

References

External links 
 Knightsbridge Schools International Montenegro Website
 Knightsbridge Schools International Website

Secondary schools in Montenegro
Private schools in Europe